Xin Qiji (28 May 1140 – 3 Oct 1207) was a Chinese poet, calligrapher, and military general during the Southern Song dynasty (1127–1279).

Life
During Xin's lifetime, northern China was occupied during the Jin–Song Wars by the Jurchens of the Jin dynasty, a semi-nomadic people who moved to what is now Northeastern China. Only southern China was ruled by the Han Chinese during the Southern Song dynasty. Xin was born in the modern city of Jinan in Shandong Province, then governed by the Jin Dynasty. Xin was raised by his grandfather because of Xin's father's early death. In his childhood, his grandfather told him about the time when the Han Chinese ruled the north and told him to be an honorable man and seek revenge against the barbarian for the nation. It was then when he developed his patriotic feelings. At the ages of 14 and 17, Xin attended the imperial examination twice, but failed both of them. However, on Xin's way to Jin's capital for examinations, he followed his grandfather's instruction to inspect the military and geographic situation in Jin dynasty. His grandfather named him after a legendary military commander from the Western Han, Huo Qubing. Both "Qubing" and "Qiji" mean to deliver oneself from diseases.

Xin started his military career at the age of twenty-two. He commanded an insurrection group of fifty men and fought the Jurchen alongside Geng Jing's much larger army that consisted of tens of thousands of men. Although they had some small-scale victories, in 1161, because the Jurchen were becoming more united internally, Xin persuaded Geng Jing to join forces with the Southern Song army in order to fight the Jurchen more effectively. Geng Jing agreed but just as Xin finished a meeting with the Southern Song Emperor, who endorsed Geng Jing's troops, Xin learned that Geng Jing had been assassinated by their former friend-turned-traitor, Zhang Anguo (张安国/張安國). With merely fifty men, Xin fought his way through the Jurchen camp and captured Zhang Anguo. Xin then led his men safely back across the border and had Zhang Anguo decapitated by the emperor.

Xin's victory gained him a place in the Southern Song court. However, because the emperor was surrounded by people who supported "an appeasement policy" rather than open warfare with the Jin, Xin was sidelined. From 1161 to 1181, he held a series of minor posts that never amounted to anything momentous. Although during the same period, he tried to offer the emperor his treatises on how to manage the invasions by the Jin as well as other state affairs, he was never taken seriously. Finally he resolved to do things on his own. He improved the irrigation systems in his district, relocated poverty-struck peasants and trained his own troops. His ambition soon aroused suspicion against him. In 1181, he was forced to resign. He left for Jiangxi where he then stayed and perfected his famous ci form of poetry for ten depressing years.

In 1192, Xin was recalled to the Song court to take up another minor post because the previous incumbent had died. This job did not last long because once he completed the requirements of his job, he started training men for military purposes again. He was soon discharged.

From 1192 to 1203, Xin lived in seclusion around Jiangxi Province. Xin gave himself an art name – "Jiaxuan", which meant "Life should be diligent and take farming as the prime importance".

In 1188, Xin met another patriotic poet, Chen Liang, in E hu Temple (around Piao Spring, Jiangxi Province). They conferred the strategy to fight against Jin dynasty and revive their home country.

During Xin's seclusion, Xin also traveled with Zhu Xi, the master of Neo Confucianism, in Wuyi Mountain. In 1200, upon Zhu xi's death, none of Zhu's old friends or students mourned him because of the political restriction. However, Xin attended the funeral and wrote lament for Zhu.

In 1203, as the Jin began pressing harder against the Southern Song border, Han Tuozhou, the consul of the Southern Song court, in need of militarists, took Xin under his wing. However, Han Tuozhou disregarded Xin's sincere advice for effective military moves, and he removed Xin from his team the next year, accusing Xin of being lubricious, avaricious, and many other non-existent faults. The crucial moment came in 1207 when the Jin defiantly asked for Han Tuozhou's head for a peace treaty. It was then that Han realized that he needed Xin again. Xin did not hesitate in responding to Han's call for help; unfortunately, he died of old age soon afterward.

In 1208, after Xin's death, Ni si impeached him for committing treason and requested the Southern Song government to deprive's Xin's official title. In 1257, Xie Fangde petitioned the Southern Song government for justifying Xin's innocence. The government then vindicated Xin and endowed him a posthumous title – "Zhong Min", which meant loyalty and encouragement.

Works
Some six hundred and twenty of Xin's poems survive today. All were written after he moved to the south.

Poetry
Scholars considered Xin's literary caliber to be equally talented in ci as his Song dynasty counterpart, Su Shi. Their difference, however, is that the content of Xin's poetry spans an even greater range of topics. Xin is also famous for employing many allusions in his poems.

Some of the most quoted lines from his poetry (with accompanying translations) are shown below.

In the last line, there is a sudden transition (leap) from Xin's personal understanding of melancholy to the season that he's experiencing. This leap probably presents itself as a formidable psychological and cultural obstacle for a non-Chinese speaker. The autumn carries many meanings in Chinese literature.

Deeper understanding of the last line is full of sadness :

The true sorrow can't be expressed by words;

or repeating the sorrow is another deep hurt;

or even you can find the words to show your bitterness, but no one understands it;

or even you can find people who understand your bitterness, but things have happened and nothing will be changed.

Same meaning was also expressed in others poems, for example, one by Fang Yue, "Life is full of disappointments, hardly any can we confide in others".  宋人方岳诗："不如意事常八九，可与人言无二三。”(《别才子方令》

The merit of this poem is talking about melancholy in a mild and subtle way with using autumn. This is one reason people love this poem and quote it ever so often today.

Calligraphy 
Little of Xin's calligraphy has survived. Quguo tie is the only preserved one which is now documented in Beijing Palace Museum. Quguo tie was created in Xin's 36 years old (around 1175 Oct), after Xin suppressed the bandit's rebellion in Jiangxi.

Commentaries 
The 20th-century Chinese diplomat and philosopher Hu Shih asserts that Xin Qiji ranks first among authors in creative lyrics. According to Hu, Xin shows great talent, keen intellect, intensive and sincere feeling in writing lyrics.

The Chinese ethnologist and historian Bai Shouyi stated that Xin Qiji aimed his life at recovering the lost territories and contributing to his country. Unfortunately, Xin was ill-fated and repressed, and so failed to realize his ambitions. However, Xin never shook his patriotic resolve, and put all his enthusiasm and worries about national destiny to the creation of poetry.

The Chinese historian Deng Guangming contends that although Xin was inherently an extremely passionate patriot, he was forced to pretend to be a detached and calm man, who is indifferent about political affairs.

See also

List of Chinese authors
Song poetry

References
Liu, Zhongmei, Ed. Xin Qiji. Beijing: Wuzhou Chuanbo Chubenshe, 2005.
Lo, Irving Yucheng. Hsin Ch'i-chi. New York: Twayne Publishers, Inc., 1971.

Further reading

External links

 

1140 births
1207 deaths
12th-century Chinese poets
13th-century Chinese poets
Artists from Jinan
Generals from Shandong
Poets from Shandong
Song dynasty calligraphers
Song dynasty generals
Song dynasty poets
Writers from Jinan